A codex is a book bound in the modern manner, by joining pages, as opposed to a rolled scroll.

Codex may also refer to:

In computing
 Codex Corporation, a Massachusetts tech company later known as Vanguard Managed Solutions
 Codex Digital, a high-resolution media recording system
 WordPress Codex, a repository and manual for WordPress documentation
 OpenAI Codex, an artificial intelligence model generating code from natural language

In education
 Stanford CodeX Center, a research center at Stanford University focused on artificial intelligence and law.

In entertainment and media

 Codex (Warhammer 40,000), a rules supplement to the tabletop wargame
 Codex (novel), by Lev Grossman (2005)
 The Codex (novel), by Douglas Preston (2004)
 "Codex", song by Pere Ubu from Dub Housing 
 "Codex", song by Radiohead from The King of Limbs 
 Codex (TV series), a UK quiz show
 Codex, a fictional character from the web series The Guild
 Codex: card-time strategy, a card game by David Sirlin (2016)

Other
 1983 Code of Canon Law, also known as the Codex Iuris Canonici
 Codex (horse) (1977–1984), American racehorse, Preakness Stakes winner
 Codex Alimentarius, a collection of internationally recognized standards relating to food
 Codex, a warez group

See also
Codec (disambiguation)